PT Indomarco Prismatama or Indomaret (short for Indonesia Market Retail) is a chain of retail convenience stores from Indonesia, with over 18,000 stores  across Indonesia. It is the first and largest chain of this kind of store in Indonesia. Indomaret is predominantly owned by Indoritel and headquartered in Jakarta.

Indomaret is a minimarket network that provides daily needs. It has a store area of about 200m2. The first official Indomaret store was opened in Ancol, North Jakarta in November 1988. By 2014, Indomaret had 10,600 outlets. 60% of the total outlets are self-owned and franchised outlets while the remaining 40% are company-owned, scattered in towns in Greater Jakarta, Sumatra (except West Sumatra, where the permit was banned for the protection of small traders), Java, Madura, Lesser Sunda Islands, Kalimantan, Maluku Islands, and Sulawesi. In Jakarta, there are about 488 outlets.

Indomaret stores are easily found in residential areas, office buildings, and public facilities due to the placement location of outlets being based on the motto "simple and frugal" (Indonesian: mudah dan hemat). Indomaret sells more than 5,000 types of food products and non-food items.

Indomaret also have two sub-brands, Indomaret Point which also serves fast food with table and seats, and the larger Indomaret Fresh which also sell fruits, vegetables and meats.

See also 
 Convenience stores
 Alfamart
 7-Eleven
 FamilyMart
 Lawson
 Ministop
 All Day

References

External links 
 

Companies based in Jakarta
Convenience stores
Indonesian brands
Indonesian companies established in 1988
Retail companies established in 1988
Retail companies of Indonesia